The Prix de Flore is a French literary prize founded in 1994 by Frédéric Beigbeder. The aim of the prize is to reward youthful authors and is judged by a panel of journalists. It is awarded yearly in November, at the Café de Flore in Paris. The prize only applies to French-language literature, even though the author does not have to be French. Bruce Benderson was the first non-French author to receive the prize, in 2004, for the novel Autobiographie érotique (released in English as The Romanian: Story of an Obsession).
The laureate of the Prix de Flore wins about 6,000 Euros and is entitled to drink a glass of Pouilly-Fumé, a white wine from the Loire region of France, at the Café de Flore every day for a year. The laureate's name is engraved on the glass.

Laureates 
 1994: Cantique de la racaille by Vincent Ravalec
 1995: Le Pas du loup by Jacques A. Bertrand
 1996: Le Sens du combat by Michel Houellebecq
 1997: Le Chameau sauvage by Philippe Jaenada
 1998: Les Jolies Choses by Virginie Despentes
 1999: Nicolas Pages by Guillaume Dustan
 2000: Mémoire courte by Nicolas Rey
 2001: L'Empire de la morale by Christophe Donner
 2002: Rapport sur moi by Grégoire Bouillier
 2003: Mammifères by Pierre Mérot
 2004: Autobiographie érotique by Bruce Benderson
 2005: Boys boys boys by Joy Sorman
 2006: Rendez-vous by Christine Angot
 2007: Ni d'Ève ni d'Adam by Amélie Nothomb
 2008: La meilleure part des hommes by Tristan Garcia 
 2009: L'hyper Justine by Simon Liberati
 2010: Le jour du roi by Abdellah Taïa
 2011: Du temps qu'on existait by Marien Defalvard
 2012: Zénith-Hôtel by Oscar Coop-Phane
 2013: Tout cela n'a rien à voir avec moi by Monica Sabolo
 2014: L'Aménagement du territoire by Aurélien Bellanger
 2015: La Fleur du Capital by Jean-Noël Orengo
 2016: Double Nationalité by Nina Yargekov, 
 2017: (ex-æquo),  by Pierre Ducrozet Actes Sud 
 2018:  by Raphaël Rupert 
 2019:  by Sofia Aouine 
 2020 : La Grâce by Thibault de Montaigu, Éditions Plon
 2021: Le Voyant d’Etampes by Abel Quentin,

References 

Flore
Flore
Literary awards honouring young writers
Awards established in 1994
1994 establishments in France